The Church of Saint-Jacques was a former Roman Catholic neo-Gothic church located in Abbeville, France.

The building, built from 1868 to 1876 on the site of a 12th-century church, gradually deteriorated due to lack of maintenance at the beginning of the 21st century. It was demolished from January to May 2013. In June 2013, a new park project presented by the town hall was approved by around thirty residents present. The works were carried out at the beginning of 2015.

References

Further reading 
LaTribune de l'Art: L’église Saint-Jacques d’Abbeville va être détruite, Didier Rykner, 8 February 2013

External links 

19th-century Roman Catholic church buildings in France
Demolished buildings and structures in France
Destroyed churches in France
Abbeville
Churches in Somme (department)